Gitau is a surname. Notable people with the surname include:
Boniface Gitau(born 1999), Kenyan computer scientist and a businessman

Elizabeth Gitau (born 1988), Kenyan physician, businesswoman and corporate executive
Paul Gitau, Kenyan volleyball coach
Peter Njuguna Gitau (born 1962), Kenyan politician
Shikoh Gitau (c. 1981), Kenyan computer scientist
William Gitau (born 1961), Kenyan politician